Susan Narucki is an  American operatic soprano who specializes in performances of contemporary classical music.

Career 
She has appeared in the world premieres of several operas at the Dutch National Opera including Louis Andriessen and Peter Greenaway's Writing to Vermeer and Claude Vivier's Reves d'un Marco Polo as well as in Elliott Carter's What Next?

Selected awards 

 Best Classical Contemporary Composition Grammy Award for  the recording of George Crumb's Star-Child (2000).
 Best Classical Vocal Performance Grammy Nomination (2002) for the recording of Elliott Carter's Tempo e Tempi. 
 UCSD Chancellor's Associates Faculty Excellence Award (2014)
 Best Classical Solo Vocal Album Nomination for “The Edge of Silence — Works For Voice By György Kurtág” (2020).

References

Sources
Biography on www.susannarucki.net Susan Narucki
Peter Dickinson, Review: George Crumb - Star-Child, Mundus Canis, 3 Early Songs, Gramophone, April, 2000. Accessed 27 December 2007 (registration required).
Anthony Tommasini, '6 Characters in Search of a Dimension, in Different Operatic Tempos' (Review of the New York stage premiere Elliott Carter's What Next?, New York Times, December 10, 2007. Accessed 27 December 2007.

Living people
American operatic sopranos
Year of birth missing (living people)
21st-century American women